The 2022 Global Awards was not held in a physical location due to the ongoing effects of the COVID-19 pandemic in the United Kingdom. Winners were announced through the company's official website and on social network pages on 14 April 2022.

Nominees and winners 
The list of nominees was announced on 5 April 2022. The Winners are in Bold.

References 

2022 music awards
British music awards
2022 awards in the United Kingdom
April 2022 events in the United Kingdom